Echinaria is a genus of Eurasian and North African plants in the grass family. The only known species is Echinaria capitata, native to the Mediterranean Region as well as the Southwest and Central Asia (from Portugal and Morocco to Kazakhstan).

References

Pooideae
Monotypic Poaceae genera
Flora of Asia